The Bald Head River is a short river in Ferryland electoral district on the Avalon Peninsula in Newfoundland and Labrador, Canada.

See also
 List of rivers of Newfoundland and Labrador

References

Rivers of Newfoundland and Labrador